Port Gawler may refer to:

Port Gawler, South Australia, a locality and a former town 
Port Gawler Conservation Park, a former protected area in South Australia
District Council of Port Gawler, a former local government area in South Australia
Hundred of Port Gawler, a cadastral unit in South Australia

See also

Gawler (disambiguation)